Cynosura or Kynosoura may refer to:
Cynosura (Laconia), a settlement that coalesced into ancient Sparta
Cynosura (Salamis), a promontory of Salamis Island
the Greek name of Ursa Minor
Cynosura (nymph), a mountain nymph in Greek mythology